Asura unipuncta is a moth of the family Erebidae. It is found in China.

Subspecies
Asura unipuncta unipuncta
Asura unipuncta mienshanica Daniel, 1952 (Shensi)
Asura unipuncta szetschwanica (Daniel, 1952)

References

unipuncta
Moths described in 1890
Moths of Asia